The Arab Socialist Ba'ath Party – Lebanon Region, commonly known as the Arab Socialist Ba'ath Party in Lebanon ( Ḥizb al-Ba‘th al-‘Arabī al-Ishtirākī fī Lubnān) and officially the Lebanon Regional Branch, is a political party in Lebanon. It is the regional branch of the Damascus-based Arab Socialist Ba'ath Party. The leadership has been disputed since 2015; however, Fayez Shukr was the party leader from 2006 to 2015, when he succeeded Sayf al-Din Ghazi who in turn succeeded Assem Qanso.

History
The Lebanese branch of the undivided Ba'ath Party had been formed in 1949–1950. Assem Qanso is the longest-serving secretary (leader) of the Lebanese Ba'ath Party; first from 1971 to 1989 and again from 2000 to 2005. In 1953 it merged with Arab Socialist Party headed by Akram Hourani, and the current title was adopted. One of its secretary generals was Abdallah Al Amin , and the headquarters is in Beirut.

Lebanese Civil War
During the start of the Lebanese Civil War in 1975, the party had an armed militia, the Assad Battalion, of some 2,000 armed men. The party joined forces with Kamal Jumblatt's Progressive Socialist Party in organizing the Lebanese National Movement, seeking to abolish the confessional state. The Lebanese National Movement was later superseded by the Lebanese National Resistance Front, in which the party participated. The party organized resistance against Israeli forces in Lebanon. In July 1987 it took part in forming yet another front, the Unification and Liberation Front.

Post-War
In the 2009 parliamentary election, the party won two seats as part of the March 8 Alliance. The parliamentarians of the party are Assem Qanso and Qassem Hashem.

The Lebanese Ba'ath Party is also militarily involved in the Syrian Civil War, and has sent forces under its control to aid Bashar al-Assad's government against the Syrian opposition. One contingent, allegedly 400 fighters strong, took part in the Daraa offensive (June 2017). Its commander, Hussein Ali Rabiha from Nabatieh, was killed during this operation.

Prior to the 2018 Lebanese general election, the Lebanese Ba'ath Party had suffered a split, with Regional Secretary Assem Qanso and Numan Shalq heading in different directions. Both factions had nominated candidates for the elections, but none was accepted into a list and were thus eliminated from the polls. Reportedly, the Syrian ambassador, Ali Abdul Karim, had lobbied against any list accepting Qanso's candidates, as his group is not recognized from Damascus. A Baathist politician, Kassem Hachem, was included in a list in South III as Amal candidate, but not on behalf of the party. Former Regional Secretary Fayez Shukr headed a list in Bekaa III. On 7 April 2019, the Lebanese Ba'ath Party and other parties staged pro-Syrian demonstrations in Beirut; this was the "first such show of its kind" since 2005.

Party leaders
Mahmoud Baydoun (1966–1969)
Magali Nasrawin (1969–1971)
Assem Qanso (1971–1989)
Abdallah Al Amin (1989–1993)
Abdallah Chahal (1993–1996)
Sayf al-Din Ghazi (1996–2000)
Assem Qanso (2000–2005)
Sayf al-Din Ghazi (2005–2006)
Fayez Shukr (2006–2015)
Abdul Mou'in Ghazi (2015–2016)
Suheil Qassar (2016)
Nu'man Shalaq (2016–2021)
Ali Hijazi (2021–present)

Legislative Elections

See also
Socialist Arab Lebanon Vanguard Party
Lebanese Civil War
Lebanese National Movement
Mountain War (Lebanon)

References

External links

1953 establishments in Lebanon
Arab nationalism in Lebanon
Arab nationalist militant groups
Ba'athist parties
Lebanon
Factions in the Lebanese Civil War
Lebanese National Movement
Lebanese National Resistance Front
March 8 Alliance
Nationalist parties in Lebanon
Political parties established in 1953
Pro-government factions of the Syrian civil war
Socialist parties in Lebanon
Axis of Resistance